The Jane Whitney Show was a 1992 broadcast syndication tabloid talk show hosted by journalist Jane Whitney. While it was syndicated, it appeared in 19 of the largest 20 TV markets.

References

External links 

1992 American television series debuts
1994 American television series endings
1990s American television talk shows
NBC original programming
First-run syndicated television programs in the United States
Television series by Telepictures